The The Space Research and Technology Agency under the Cabinet of Ministers of the Republic of Uzbekistan also known as Uzbekspace agency is the official Uzbek state space agency. The agency is officially tasked with "the development and implementation of a unified state policy and strategic directions in the field of space research and technology." Uzbekcosmos was formed by decree of Uzbek President Shavkat Mirziyoyev on August 30, 2019. Uzbekcosmos had previously existed in some form since at least 2001, when the agency signed a framework of mutual cooperation with Russia's Khrunichev State Research and Production Space Center.

References 

Space agencies
Space programs by country